Parides orellana is a species of butterfly in the family Papilionidae. It is found in the Neotropical realm. (Colombia, Ecuador, Venezuela, Peru, Brazil (Amazonas)).

The larvae possibly feed on Aristolochia barbata.

Description from Seitz

P. orellana Hew. (2 c). The most beautiful species of the aeneas-group. Forewing in both sexes 
black, bluish in a side-view, with white spots on the fringes. Hindwing in the male with a very large red
area, not opalescent; in the female with a broad red band. — Upper Amazon, from Ega to Iquitos.

Description from Rothschild and Jordan(1906)

A full description is provided by Rothschild, W. and Jordan, K. (1906)

Taxonomy

Parides orellana is a member of the aeneas species group

References

Lewis, H. L., 1974 Butterflies of the World  Page 26, figure 18

Butterflies described in 1852
Parides
Papilionidae of South America